Luan José Niedzielski (born 11 February 1991), simply known as Luan, is a retired Brazilian footballer who played as a midfielder. He announced his retirement from football at the age of 26.

Club career
Born in São Bento do Sul, Santa Catarina, Luan graduated with Figueirense's youth setup. He made his senior debuts while on loan at Brusque in 2012.

In March 2013, Luan was loaned to Metropolitano. He returned to Figueira in May, and made his professional debut on 28 May, coming on as a second-half substitute in a 4–2 away win against América-MG for the Série B championship.

On 19 April 2014, Luan made his Série A debut, starting in a 0–3 loss at Fluminense. On 23 August, in a match against Vitória, he suffered a serious knee injury, being sidelined until February of the following year.

Honours
Campeonato Catarinense: 2014

References

External links
Luan at playmakerstats.com (English version of ogol.com.br)

1991 births
Living people
Sportspeople from Santa Catarina (state)
Brazilian footballers
Association football midfielders
Campeonato Brasileiro Série A players
Campeonato Brasileiro Série B players
Figueirense FC players
Brusque Futebol Clube players
Clube Atlético Metropolitano players
Esporte Clube Internacional de Lages players